Colobothea maculicollis is a species of beetle in the family Cerambycidae. It was described by Henry Walter Bates in 1865. It is known from Venezuela.

References

maculicollis
Beetles described in 1865